The Forty-eighth Amendment of the Constitution of India, officially known as The Constitution (Forty-eighth Amendment) Act, 1984, inserted a new proviso in clause (5) of article 356 of the Constitution in order to provide that in the case of the Proclamation issued by the President on 6 October 1983 with respect to the State of Punjab, Parliament may pass any resolution with respect to the continuance in force of the Proclamation for a period up to two years.

Text

Proposal and enactment
The Constitution (Forty-eighth Amendment) Act, 1984 was introduced in the Lok Sabha on 17 August 1984 as the Constitution (Fiftieth Amendment) Bill, 1984 (Bill No. 77 of 1984). It was introduced by P.V. Narasimha Rao, then Minister of Home Affairs. The Bill sought to amend article 356 of the Constitution, and insert a new proviso in clause (5) of article 356 of the Constitution in order to provide that in the case of the Proclamation issued by the President on 6 October 1983 with respect to the State of Punjab, Parliament may pass any resolution with respect to the continuance in force of the Proclamation for a period up to two years. The full text of the Statement of Objects and Reasons appended to the bill is given below:

The Bill was considered by the Lok Sabha on 23 August 1984, and passed on the same day with a formal amendment changing the short title to "The Constitution (Forty-eighth Amendment) Act, 1984". The Bill, as passed by the Lok Sabha, was considered and passed by the Rajya Sabha on 25 August 1984. The bill received assent from then President Giani Zail Singh on 26 August 1984. It was notified in The Gazette of India, and came into effect on the same date.

See also
List of amendments of the Constitution of India

References

48
1984 in India
1984 in law
Indira Gandhi administration